Christel Baier (born 26 September 1965) is a German theoretical computer scientist known for her work in model checking, temporal logic, and automata theory. She is a professor at TU Dresden, where she holds the chair for Algebraic and Logic Foundations of Computer Science in the Faculty of Computer Science. Baier is the editor-in-chief of Acta Informatica.

Education and career
Baier earned a diploma in mathematics at the University of Mannheim in 1990, and stayed at the same university for graduate study in computer science, completing her Ph.D. there in 1994. Her dissertation, Transitionssystem- und Baum-Semantiken für CCS, was supervised by Mila Majster-Cederbaum. She earned a habilitation at Mannheim in 1999.

She became an associate professor for computer science at the University of Bonn in 1999, and moved to TU Dresden as a professor in 2006.

Book
With Joost-Pieter Katoen, Baier is coauthor of the book Principles of Model Checking (MIT Press, 2008).

Recognition
Baier was elected to the Academia Europaea in 2011.

References

External links

1965 births
Living people
German computer scientists
German women computer scientists
Theoretical computer scientists
University of Mannheim alumni
Academic staff of the University of Bonn
Academic staff of TU Dresden
Members of Academia Europaea